Simon Bisley is a British comic book artist best known for his 1990s work on ABC Warriors, Lobo and Sláine.

Early life

Simon Bisley began drawing when he was six years old. He is self-taught, with only a short one-year stay at an art college, saying "I found it very difficult to get any kind of feedback from the art teachers. They weren't interested at all in what I was doing, so I became kind of very introverted with regard to my artwork and yeah, I was just all self-taught."

Career
Bisley started his career doing magazine and album covers, his first work being a T-shirt design for heavy metal magazine Kerrang!

Eventually, even though he had no experience in comics strip drawing at the time, he was hired by the magazine 2000 AD after they saw his interpretations of their magazine characters. According to the Comic Book Database, "while still a student, Bisley did a painting of a robot holding a baby that he sent to the offices of 2000 AD. The image was seen by Pat Mills and inspired him to relaunch the ABC Warriors strip, with Bisley as artist, in 1987". He started with work on ABC Warriors in 1987, later moving to Sláine and Judge Dredd.

Since 1997, Bisley has been a regular contributor to the comics magazine Heavy Metal.

Bisley has done design work for several music videos, including Chippendales' "Room Service".

Influences
Bisley's style is strongly influenced by Frank Frazetta, Gustav Klimt, Salvador Dalí, and Richard Corben, Bill Sienkiewicz, and Egon Schiele. He also took inspiration from rock album covers and graffiti as well as traditional comics art.

Bisley's work influenced the Beast in the 2006 Doctor Who episode "The Satan Pit", and Simon Pegg's character graphic artist Tim Bisley on the Channel 4 sitcom Spaced.

Bibliography

Comics

DC
The Authority/Lobo (with co-writers Keith Giffen and Alan Grant):
Jingle Hell (2004)
Spring Break Massacre (2005)
Batman: Black & White, miniseries, #2 (with Neil Gaiman, 1996)
Batman/Judge Dredd: Judgement on Gotham (with John Wagner and Alan Grant, 1991) 
Batman/Lobo One-Shot (April 2000)
Global Frequency #7 (with Warren Ellis, 2003)
Hellblazer #259-260, 265-266, 282 (full art); #271-274 (along with Giuseppe Camuncoli) (2009–11)
Lobo:
 The Last Czarnian (with co-writers Keith Giffen and Alan Grant, 96 pages, 1992) 
 Lobo's Back (with Keith Giffen, 96 pages, 1993) 
 Paramilitary Christmas Special (with Keith Giffen and Alan Grant, 1991)

Fleetway
2000 AD (ABC Warriors): ##555-558, 563-568, 577-581 (1988); (Sláine): #626-635, 650-656, 662-664, 688-698 (1989–90); (Judge Dredd) #1068 (1997)
Judge Dredd Megazine #1.14, 1.16, 1.17, 1.19, 2.61, 2.62, 3.15, 3.17 (1991–96)

Full Circle
Full Cirkle, vol. 1 (with Simon Reed, 2003)
Full Cirkle, vol. 2 (with Simon Reed, 2007)
Thicker Than Blood (colours, with Simon Reed and art by Mike Ploog, 2007)

Marvel
X-Men Unlimited #46 (with Ian Edginton, 2003)
Halo Graphic Novel, (with Lee Hammock, 2006)
Incredible Hulk #620 (with Brandon Montclare, 2011)

Verotik
 Verotika #1 (with Glenn Danzig (w), 1994)
 Verotika #2 (cover, 1995)
 Death Dealer #1 (with Glenn Danzig (w) and Frank Frazetta (cover), 1995)
 Satanika (Vol 1) #0 (with Glenn Danzig (w) and Frank Frazetta (cover), 1995)
 Satanika (Vol 1) #1-2 (covers, 1995)
 Jaguar God #0 (with Glenn Danzig (w), 1996)
 Verotik Illustrated (with Bill Oakley, 1997)
 Hidden Lyrics of the Left Hand  (with Glenn Danzig (w), 2010)
 Lyrics of the Left Hand, Volume II (with Glenn Danzig (w), 2018)

Other publishers
 "Once Upon A Time in the West" (with Alan Grant, in Toxic! #1, 1991)
 "Reapers" (with John Arcudi, in Dark Horse Presents: Aliens, Dark Horse Comics, 1992, collected in Aliens Omnibus #3, 2008)
 The Terminator: The Enemy Within #1-4 (Dark Horse Comics, 1991–1992, covers) 
 Bisley's Scrapbook (Atomeka Press, 1993)
Melting Pot (with Kevin Eastman/Eric Talbot, Kitchen Sink Press, 1995)
Teenage Mutant Ninja Turtles: Bodycount (with Kevin Eastman, 4-issue mini-series, tpb, Image Comics, 1996, tpb)
Mutant Chronicles: Golgotha (illustration by Bisley, Acclaim Comics, 1996)
Bad Boy (with Frank Miller, one-shot, Oni Press, Dynamite Entertainment, 1997)
Fistful of Blood (with script and layouts by Kevin Eastman, in Heavy Metal #192-202, May 2001 - January 2003, hardcover, 64 pages, February 2003)
 The Dead  (with Alan Grant, Berserker Comics, 2008-2009)
 Church of Hell #1-3 (Berserker Comics, 2009, covers)
The Lost Pages (Zaid Comics, 2020, cover)
SOS: Onslaught (Chimera Comics, 2020, cover)

Collected editions
The Authority/Lobo: Holiday Hell (160 pages, 2006) 
Global Frequency, Volume 2: Detonation Radio, 
 Heavy Metal Dredd (with John Wagner/Alan Grant, reprinted from Rock Power, collected in Heavy Metal Dredd ):
 "A Mega-City Primer" (in Judge Dredd Megazine #1.14, 1991 and 2000 AD #1068, 1997)
 "Rock On, Tommy Who?!" (in Judge Dredd Megazine #1.16, 1992)
 "Chicken Run" (in Judge Dredd Megazine #1.17, 1992)
 "The Legend of Johnny Biker" (in Judge Dredd Megazine #1.19, 1992)
 "Ironfist" (in Judge Dredd Megazine #2.61, 1994)
 "Night Before Christmas" (in Judge Dredd Megazine #2.62, 1994)
 "The Great Arsoli" (in Judge Dredd Megazine #3.15, 1996)
 "Bimba" (in Judge Dredd Megazine #3.17, 1996)

Music album covers
 Mayhemic Destruction (1987), by Mortal Sin
 Created in Hate  (1988) by Annihilated
 First Offence (1988), by First Offence
 Kilt by Death (1990), by Drunken State
 Thrall-Demonsweatlive (1993), by Danzig
 6:66 Satan's Child (1999), by Danzig
 Gorgeous Frankenstein (2007), by Gorgeous Frankenstein
 Lost Tracks of Danzig (2007), by Danzig
 Among Flies (2008), by Last House on The Left
 Black Laden Crown (2017) by Danzig
 The Blood of Gods (2017), by Gwar

Computer game box
 Gods (1991), by The Bitmap Brothers
 Weaponlord (1995), by Visual Concepts
 Fur Fighters (2000), by Bizarre Creations (Viggo's Revenge release)
 Tekken Tag Tournament 2 (2012), by Namco Bandai Games (Heihachi Mishima's second costume.)

Role-playing games
 Conan: Adventures in an Age Undreamed Of (2017, Modiphius Entertainment, inner pages illustrations by Simon Bisley, among others)

Movie posters
 Centurion (2010) (Possibly in error, also attributed to Simon Bowles and Pathe productions.)
 Black Death (2010)

Books
Biz: The Intense Art of Simon Bisley (Verotik Pub Inc, August 1997)
Fakk 2 (80 pages, Heavy Metal Magazine, June 1999)
The Art of Simon Bisley Redux (132 pages, Heavy Metal Magazine, June 2007)
Simon Bisley's Illustrations from the Bible: A Work in Progress (Heavy Metal Magazine, July 2007)
Simon Bisley Calendar 2010 (Heavy Metal Magazine, August 2009)

Awards
 1990: Won "Favourite Artist UK" Eagle Award
 1992:
 Won "Best Artist" Eisner Award, for Judgement on Gotham
 Won "Best Artist" UK Comic Art Award
 Won "Best Original Graphic Novel" UK Comic Art Award for Judgment on Gotham (with John Wagner and Alan Grant)
 Nominated for "Best Cover Artist" Eisner Award, for Judgement on Gotham and Doom Patrol
 Nominated for "Best Graphic Album: New/First US Publication" Eisner Award, for Judgement on Gotham (with Alan Grant and John Wagner)
 1993:
 Nominated for "Best Cover Artist" Eisner Award, for Grendel: War Child, Terminator, and Enemy Within
 Nominated for "Best Painter (Interior)" Eisner Award, for "Lair of the Lizard Ladies" in Mr. Monster Attacks #3
 Nominated for "Best Artist" UK Comic Art Award
 2002: Nominated for "Best Artist Ever" National Comics Award

References

External links

 
 
 
 Simon Bisley - Lambiek Comiclopedia
 Simon Bisley - 2000adonline.com credits list
 

British graphic novelists
Living people
1962 births
Eisner Award winners for Best Penciller/Inker or Penciller/Inker Team